Cabranes is a municipality in the Autonomous Community of the Principality of Asturias.  Some Towns of cabranes are: Santolaya, Torazu, Fresnéu, Graméu, Pandenes, Viñón, Niao, Arboleya, etc. It is bordered on the north by Villaviciosa, on the south by Piloña and Nava, on the east by Piloña and Villaviciosa and on the west by Villaviciosa y Nava.

Toponymy

The decree 118/2005 of November 17, 2005, published in the December 2 Boletín Oficial del Principado de Asturias (BOPA; official bulletin of the Principality of Asturias) granted the Asturian forms of the municipal place names official status for all uses. Therefore, the Asturian names are the only ones which can appear on road signs and official maps.

Parishes
Fresnéu
Graméu (Gramedo)
Pandenes
Santolaya (Santa Eulalia)
Torazu (Torazo)
Viñón

Art
Because the municipality had a great number of 'Indianos', there is a rich civil architecture. Notable among the buildings are the schools of Viñón and Santolaya, and the chalet of Alfonso San Feliz.

There are also many religious buildings, such as the church of San Julián de Viñon, declared an Artistic Historic Monument, in a mixed style of Pre-Roman Asturian and Romanesque. The parish church of Santa Eulalia, from the 15th century, and the church of San Martín el Real, in a mannerist style, are also notable.

Politics 
The current mayor is Gerardo Fabián (FSA-PSOE).

Towns 
Fresnéu
Graméu (Gramedo)
Pandenes
Santolaya (Santa Eulalia)
Torazu (Torazo)
Viñón
Arboleya
Niao
Vegapallía
Valbuena

References

External links

Federación Asturiana de Concejos 
Ayuntamiento de Cabranes 

Municipalities in Asturias